The following is a list of state highways in the U.S. state of Louisiana designated in the 600–649 range.


Louisiana Highway 600

Louisiana Highway 601

Louisiana Highway 601 (LA 601) runs  runs in a north–south direction from Eakers Street and Crothers Drive near I-20 and LA 602-1 in Richmond, along Crothers Drive, to and Johnson Street to US 65 (South Cedar Street/South Chestnut Street) in downtown Tallulah. LA 601 also serves as the eastern terminus for LA 3202 (Felicia Avenue).

LA 601 first appeared on the official state highway map in 1976, running between US 65 in Tallulah, to LA 602 in Richmond, south of present day I-20 (which was under construction at the time. In 1977, LA 601 was truncated to its current terminus after I-20 was completed, cutting off the southern section of the route. This former section of LA 601 is now known as Eaker Road and is locally maintained.

Major intersections

Louisiana Highway 602

Louisiana Highway 602 (LA 602) presently consists of two segments of state highways (LA 601-1 and LA 602-2) in Madison Parish that connect I-20 and US 80. The two segments of this road previously connected on a road (known only as LA 602 at the time) south of I-20 paralleling Brushy Bayou and Walnut Bayou. LA 602 first appeared on state highway maps in 1960, utilizing this route. LA 602 ran  in total length. The middle segment between I-20 exits 173 and 182, which comprised most of the route, was deleted from the state highway system around 2013. The remaining sections between I-20 and US 80 became LA 602-1 and LA 602-2 respectively, effectively retiring the non-hyphenated LA 602 designation.

Louisiana Highway 602-1

Louisiana Highway 602-1 (LA 602-1) runs near Richmond between US 80 and I-20's exit 173. It is a two-lane roadway that runs to the east of Richmond mostly paralleling a canal named Brushy Bayou.

Major intersections

Louisiana Highway 602-2

Louisiana Highway 602-2 (LA 602-2) runs inside Mound between I-20's exit 182 and US 82.

Major intersections

Louisiana Highway 603

Louisiana Highway 604

Louisiana Highway 605

Louisiana Highway 605 (LA 605) runs  in a north–south direction from the junction of LA 128 and LA 897-1 in St. Joseph to US 65 north of Newellton, Tensas Parish.

LA 605 heads north from St. Joseph following the shoreline of Lake Bruin, an oxbow lake of the Mississippi River.  The highway intersects LA 607 and LA 604 as it breaks away from the lake to the northeast.  It then intersects LA 608 and turns northwest, continuing the route of that highway along Lake St. Joseph, a second oxbow lake.  Passing through the town of Newellton, LA 605 intersects LA 4 and LA 887.  Following a turn to the north at Balmoral, the highway ends at an intersection with US 65.

Louisiana Highway 606

Louisiana Highway 607

Louisiana Highway 607 (LA 607) runs  in an east–west direction from US 65 to LA 605 north of Lake Bruin, Tensas Parish.

The route serves as a short connector, providing access to Lake Bruin from US 65.  LA 607 is located roughly midway between St. Joseph and Newellton.  It is an undivided two-lane highway for its entire length.

Louisiana Highway 608

Louisiana Highway 609

Louisiana Highway 610

Louisiana Highway 611

Louisiana Highway 612

Louisiana Highway 613

Louisiana Highway 614

Louisiana Highway 615

Louisiana Highway 615 (LA 615) runs  in an east–west direction from a junction with LA 157 and LA 159 north of Shongaloo, Webster Parish to US 79 in Haynesville, Claiborne Parish.

Louisiana Highway 616

Louisiana Highway 617

Louisiana Highway 618

Louisiana Highway 619

Louisiana Highway 620

Louisiana Highway 620 (LA 620) runs  in an east–west direction from LA 413 in Erwinville to LA 415 northwest of Port Allen, West Baton Rouge Parish.

LA 620 heads due east from LA 413, just north of the latter's intersection with the concurrent US 190 and LA 1 in Erwinville.  LA 620 intersects three minor state routes (LA 3091, LA 984, and LA 983) before terminating at LA 415 (River Road) in an area known as Smithfield.  LA 620 is an undivided two-lane highway for its entire length.

Before the 1955 Louisiana Highway renumbering, LA 620 was part of State Route 30.

Louisiana Highway 621

Louisiana Highway 621 (LA 621) runs  in an east–west direction from LA 73 in Prairieville to LA 431 at Brignac, Ascension Parish.

The route heads east from LA 73 (Old Jefferson Highway) adjacent to I-10 Exit 173.  It crosses both US 61 (Airline Highway) and LA 44 (North Burnside Avenue) north of Gonzales before ending at LA 431 in an area known as Brignac.  LA 621 is an undivided two-lane highway for its entire length.

Louisiana Highway 622

Louisiana Highway 623

Louisiana Highway 624

Louisiana Highway 624 (LA 624) runs  in an east–west direction from LA 46 in Yscloskey to a point near the Mississippi River Gulf Outlet Canal east of Hopedale, St. Bernard Parish.

The route heads southeast from Yscloskey, running along the north bank of Bayou La Loutre.  After passing through Hopedale, LA 624 curves to the northeast with the bayou and proceeds  to the end of state maintenance.  A local road continues a short distance to a dead end at the Mississippi River Gulf Outlet Canal.  LA 624 is an undivided two-lane highway for its entire length.

Louisiana Highway 625

Louisiana Highway 625 (LA 625) runs  in an east–west direction along Maple Street in Yscloskey, St. Bernard Parish.

The route begins at LA 46 (Florissant Highway), which runs along Bayou La Loutre.  It then curves to the southeast to a dead end at Bayou Yscloskey.  It is an undivided, two-lane highway for its entire length.

In the pre-1955 state highway system, LA 625 was designated as State Route C-2073.  LA 625 was created in the 1955 Louisiana Highway renumbering, its western end following a slightly different connection to LA 46.

Louisiana Highway 626

Louisiana Highway 626 (LA 626) runs  in a north–south direction along St. Rose Avenue from LA 48 in St. Rose to US 61 at the northeast corner of Destrehan, St. Charles Parish.

The route connects the community of St. Rose with US 61 (Airline Highway) west of New Orleans.  Along its short route, LA 626 crosses both the Canadian National Railway (CN) and Kansas City Southern Railway (KCS) tracks at grade.  It also crosses under but does not intersect I-310.  LA 626 is an undivided two-lane highway for its entire length.

Louisiana Highway 627

Louisiana Highway 627 (LA 627) runs  in a north–south direction along Prospect Avenue in Norco, St. Charles Parish.

The route connects US 61 (Airline Highway) with LA 48 (River Road) in an area known as Good Hope.  It travels through the Valero and Shell–Motiva oil refineries, crossing both the Canadian National Railway (CN) and Kansas City Southern Railway (KCS) tracks at grade.  LA 627 is an undivided two-lane highway for its entire length.

In the pre-1955 state highway system, LA 627 was designated as State Route 682.  LA 627 was created in the 1955 Louisiana Highway renumbering, connecting to LA 48 at a slightly different location.  In the early 2000s, the southern portion of LA 627 was re-routed from Prospect Avenue onto a parallel road formerly known as Garrison Street.  The original route is now signed as "Old Prospect."

Louisiana Highway 628

Louisiana Highway 628 (LA 628) runs  in a general east–west direction from LA 44 in LaPlace, St. John the Baptist Parish to US 61 in Montz, St. Charles Parish.

The route heads southeast along East 5th Street from LA 44 (Main Street) in LaPlace.  It approaches and begins to run alongside the east bank levee of the Mississippi River, where it becomes known as River Road.  LA 628 intersects LA 636-1 (McReine Road) and LA 3217, two short connectors to the parallel US 61.  The highway then crosses from St. John the Baptist Parish into the St. Charles Parish community of Montz.  Reaching the Upper Guide Levee of the Bonnet Carré Spillway, LA 628 turns away from the river and heads northeast on C.C. Road.  It parallels the spillway levee to its terminus at US 61 (Airline Highway).  LA 628 is an undivided two-lane highway for its entire length.

Louisiana Highway 629

Louisiana Highway 629 (LA 629) ran  in a north–south direction along Killona Drive in Killona, St. Charles Parish.

The route headed southwest from LA 18 (River Road), which runs along the Mississippi River, to a crossing of the Texas & Pacific Railroad (now the Union Pacific Railroad) tracks on Killona Drive.  It was an undivided, two-lane highway for its entire length.

In the pre-1955 state highway system, LA 629 was designated as State Route 659.  LA 629 was created with the 1955 Louisiana Highway renumbering and deleted sometime in the 1960s.  Today a similar route, LA 3141 (Mary Plantation Road), parallels and extends beyond Killona Drive, connecting LA 18 with LA 3127, a bypass of LA 18 that was constructed in the 1970s.

Louisiana Highway 630

Louisiana Highway 630 (LA 630) ran  in a west–east direction along Courthouse Lane in Hahnville, St. Charles Parish.

The route headed southwest from LA 18 (River Road), which runs along the Mississippi River, made a zigzag around the St. Charles Parish courthouse, and continued to the Texas & Pacific Railroad (now the Union Pacific Railroad) tracks.  It was an undivided, two-lane highway for its entire length.

In the pre-1955 state highway system, LA 630 was designated as State Route 660.  LA 630 was created with the 1955 Louisiana Highway renumbering and deleted by 1958.  Today a similar route, LA 3160 (Home Place), parallels and extends beyond Courthouse Lane, connecting LA 18 with LA 3127, a bypass of LA 18 that was constructed in the 1970s.

Louisiana Highway 631

Louisiana Highway 631 (LA 631) runs  in a southwest to northeast direction from US 90 in Des Allemands to LA 52 in Boutte.

LA 631 follows the original route of US 90 before the parallel four-lane alignment was constructed.  It begins in extreme eastern Lafourche Parish and crosses Bayou Des Allemands in the community of Des Allemands.  The route then heads northeast through St. Charles Parish through the community of Paradis.  Just before reaching its terminus at LA 52 in Boutte, LA 631 crosses underneath I-310.  LA 631 is an undivided two lane highway for its entire length.

The route has a spur that travels  to a junction with US 90 in Des Allemands, providing access from the main highway to the small business district.

Louisiana Highway 632

Louisiana Highway 632 (LA 632) runs  in a general east–west direction from LA 631 in Des Allemands to a dead end at the Paradis Canal in Bayou Gauche, St. Charles Parish.

The route heads southeast along Levee Road and crosses both LA 631 Spur (Old US 90) and current US 90 in Des Allemands.  Now known as WPA Road, LA 632 turns due east into an area known as Bayou Gauche and intersects LA 306 (Bayou Gauche Road).  LA 632 turns north and runs concurrently with LA 306 for a short distance before turning east onto Grand Bayou Road, which it follows to a dead end at the Paradis Canal.  LA 632 is an undivided two-lane highway for its entire length.

Louisiana Highway 633

Louisiana Highway 633 (LA 633) runs  in a north–south direction along Magnolia Ridge Road from a local road at Grand Bayou to a junction with US 90 and LA 52 in Boutte, St. Charles Parish.  It is an undivided two-lane highway for its entire length.

Louisiana Highway 634

Louisiana Highway 634 (LA 634) ran  in a west–east direction along J.B. Green Road in Des Allemands, St. Charles Parish.

The route connected US 90 and its former alignment, LA 631 (Old Spanish Trail).  It was an undivided, two-lane highway for its entire length.

In the pre-1955 state highway system, LA 634 was designated as State Route C-1522.  LA 634 was created with the 1955 Louisiana Highway renumbering and deleted sometime in the 1960s.  However, a similar connector road to the north, LA 635 (formerly State Route C-1520), remains.

Louisiana Highway 635

Louisiana Highway 635 (LA 635) runs  in an east–west direction north of Des Allemands, St. Charles Parish.

The route connects US 90 and its former alignment, LA 631 (Old Spanish Trail) between Des Allemands and Paradis.  It is an undivided two-lane highway for its entire length.

In the pre-1955 state highway system, LA 635 was designated as State Route C-1520.  LA 635 was created in the 1955 Louisiana Highway renumbering following a different connector road immediately to the north that no longer exists.  A similar connector road to the south, LA 634 (formerly State Route C-1522), was also part of the state highway system until its deletion in the 1960s.

Louisiana Highway 636

Louisiana Highway 636 (LA 636) is the designation for a pair of state highways composing of LA 636-1 and LA 636-3 that serve Laplace, St. John the Baptist Parish, Louisiana. LA 636-3 begins at LA 44 adjacent to a Mississippi River levee and mostly runs east along this levee to LA 628 and Cardinal Street.

Louisiana Highway 637

Louisiana Highway 637 (LA 637) runs  in a north–south direction along West 10th Street from LA 44 (River Road) to US 61 (Airline Highway) in Reserve, St. John the Baptist Parish.  It is an undivided two-lane highway for its entire length.

Louisiana Highway 639

Louisiana Highway 639 (LA 639) runs  in a north–south direction off of LA 18 west of Edgard, St. John the Baptist Parish.

LA 639 is a short and lightly traveled local road that begins just north of the Union Pacific Railroad track and continues northward to LA 18 (River Road).  Its only major feature is the old Johnson (later renamed Carroll) Plantation, in which a few slave cabins and an overseer's house remain.  The route has been unsigned in recent years.

Louisiana Highway 640

Louisiana Highway 640 (LA 640) runs  in a north–south direction from LA 3127 in Edgard to a concurrency with LA 18 (River Road). Until 2013, it included a Mississippi River ferry crossing to the junction of LA 44 and LA 53 in Reserve, St. John the Baptist Parish.

LA 640 heads north from LA 3127 near West St. John High School.  It intersects LA 18 (River Road) near the St. John the Baptist Parish Courthouse, and had run 0.3 mi west along LA 18 to a ferry road. Until 2013, it crossed the river via the Edgard-Reserve Ferry.  LA 640 had ended at the east bank river road (LA 44) at an intersection with LA 53.  It is an undivided two-lane highway for its entire length.

Louisiana Highway 641

Louisiana Highway 642

Louisiana Highway 642 (LA 642) runs  in a north–south direction from LA 44 at Remy to the end of state maintenance in Grand Point, St. James Parish.

The route heads north from LA 44 at the east bank levee of the Mississippi River and crosses the Canadian National Railway (CN) tracks at grade.   later, LA 642 intersects LA 3125.  It then zigzags to the west and north through an area known as Grand Point.  At the end of its route, the highway turns east and becomes a dirt road. State maintenance ends shortly afterward as the road turns again to the north, the local road reaching a boat launch on Blind River.  LA 642 is an undivided two-lane highway for its entire length.

Louisiana Highway 643

Louisiana Highway 643 (LA 643) runs  in a general east–west direction from LA 20 to the St. James–St. John the Baptist parish line in an area known as Lower Vacherie.  It is an undivided two-lane highway for its entire length.

The route once continued further east to a dead end at Lac Des Allemands, but this portion was transferred to local control in 2018 as part of La DOTD's Road Transfer program.

Louisiana Highway 644

Louisiana Highway 644 (LA 644) runs  in a general east–west direction from LA 20 to LA 643 in Lower Vacherie, St. James Parish.

The route heads eastward through Lower Vacherie from LA 20.  After , it turns to the south and ends at an intersection with LA 643, which continues in a general eastward direction to nearby Lac Des Allemands.  LA 644 is an undivided two-lane highway for its entire length.

Louisiana Highway 645

Louisiana Highway 646

Louisiana Highway 647

Louisiana Highway 647 (LA 647) ran  in a northwest to southeast direction from LA 20 in Chackbay (shown as Chegby on maps of the time) to Sanchez Road, a local road in an area known as Choctaw.

LA 647 was an undivided two-lane highway for its entire length.

Louisiana Highway 648

Louisiana Highway 648 (LA 648) runs  in a southwest to northeast direction from LA 20 south of Thibodaux to LA 308 east of Thibodaux.

LA 648 heads east from LA 20 on Percy Brown Road, crossing from Terrebonne Parish into Lafourche Parish.  It immediately turns to the northeast and briefly passes through the southeast corner of Thibodaux.  At the end of its route, LA 648 intersects LA 1, crosses a bridge over Bayou Lafourche, and terminates immediately afterward at LA 308, which follows the opposite bank.  LA 648 is an undivided two-lane highway for its entire length.

The entire above route appears on current La DOTD maps as LA 648 and is signed accordingly in the field; however, the departmental GIS and LRS systems still show most of the route under its former designation of LA 648 Spur.  Prior to the 2000s, LA 648 turned northwest from Percy Brown Road onto Acadia Road in Thibodaux and headed back to a terminus at LA 20, existing as a short loop off of that highway.  The remainder of Percy Brown Road running northeast to LA 308 was designated as LA 648 Spur, now absorbed by the main route.

Louisiana Highway 649

Louisiana Highway 649 (LA 649) consists of a swing bridge across Bayou Lafourche in St. Charles, Lafourche Parish.

It is an undivided two-lane highway for its entire length.

In the pre-1955 state highway system, LA 649 was designated as State Route C-2137. The St. Charles Swing Bridge was constructed in 1996 and aligned with the St. Charles Bypass Road that provides a shortcut to LA 24 south of Thibodaux.

References

External links
La DOTD State, District, and Parish Maps